Kiều Chinh (born in Hanoi 1937) is a Vietnamese-American actress, producer, humanitarian, lecturer and philanthropist.

Biography
Kiều Chinh was born on September 9, 1937, in Hanoi with real name Nguyễn Thị Chinh. Her vocal sound was a past Hanoian voice which is often called as a before-1954 Hanoian sound or the nasal voice's area. Today Vietnam has very few people who speak with the old Hanoian voice.

1937-1954
During World War II, her mother and her newly born brother were killed when their hospital was struck by an Allied bombing raid targeting Japanese troops in Hanoi during the Japanese occupation of French Indochina, when Chinh was at the age of six. Even so, her father was a government official so the family was quite wealthy.

Following the end of World War II and the subsequent division of Vietnam into Communist and National regimes after the Geneva Conference, Chinh's older brother ran away from home to join the Resistance Forces. Her father urged her to board an aircraft and travel to the South, while he remained in the North to search for her older brother, promising to reunite with her in Saigon. Following her arrival in South Vietnam, however, she never saw her father again. Following her return to Vietnam in 1995 to meet her older brother, Chinh learned that her father was imprisoned in a communist re-education camp for more than six years and, after his release, died homeless and destitute.

1955-1975
Her father's friend adopted little girl Nguyễn Thị Chinh. Monsieur Nguyễn Đại Độ was worried that his son would stay in America after the airborne course, so he decided sending a telegram to the North. He asked a permission from Chinh's father to pair her with Sub-lieutenant Nguyễn Năng Tế - a first son of Mr. Độ - in 1956. Since then she only goes to church on weekends because her husband's family were Buddhists. This had a great impact on her later career.

Also in 1956, one day Kiều Chinh went for a walk near the Hôtel Continental, there was a young man who actively approached her. He asked her going to a roadside café to meet someone. Then he introduced that person as a famous director named Joseph L. Mankiewicz. Mankiewicz said that Chinh suited a fictional role whom he was going to film in Saigon. He suggested her to take script The Quiet American. However, from her family's pressure who still valued moral conservatism, Kiều Chinh had to refuse that chance. Within a week, Saigonese press spreaded news very loudly, including portrait photos of "Vietnamese unknown girl rejects Hollywood' well-known director". That's why politician Bùi Diễm invited Kiều Chinh to play the lead role in first project of his studio - Tân Việt Films. Her character was such a buddhist nun that her family agreed. So Chinh began her acting career in South Vietnam, starting with a starring role in The Bells of Thiên Mụ Temple (Hồi Chuông Thiên Mụ) (1957).

In her career spanning over sixty years from 1957 to present days, Kiều Chinh received many accolades including an Emmy Award in 1996. Her film roles included Operation C.I.A. (1965) and The Joy Luck Club (1993). She is also a president, co-founder, and co-chair of the Vietnam Children's Fund.

In the 1960s, in addition to Vietnamese films, she also appeared in several American productions including A Yank in Viet-Nam (1964) and Operation C.I.A. (1965), the latter opposite Burt Reynolds. Kiều Chinh also produced a war epic Faceless Lover (or Warrior, Who Are You) (1971), which later would be remastered and shown in the U.S. at the 2003 Vietnamese International Film Festival.

About 1970, filmmaker Hoàng Vĩnh Lộc said his best friend Kiều Chinh that : "Chinh, we made so nonsense ones that I got too bored. I have just wrote this scenario. Read ! So we now proceed it, allright ?". By Hoàng Vĩnh Lộc's idea, a feature of Faceless Lover what related so much to the military forces, so every Saigonese studios had refused. They feared the system of censorship, not to mention that South Vietnamese contemporary audiences loathed almost of war films. "Let us had better to try doing it !" — said Kiều Chinh. After the deliberation, they decided established immediately a small studio to realize ideas.

At that time, one war film was impossible with a condition of Giao Chỉ Films Studio which was privately owned, that is why general director Kiều Chinh asked for help from the Ministry of Information, Ministry of National Defence, and especially the headquarter of the Republic of Vietnam Military Forces. So during the summertime 1971, the project started filming. Last year, the film released at Rex Movie Theatre where was the biggest theatre in whole South Vietnam. Afterward it went on attending Asian Film Festival in Taipei. However, it was forbidden to release about a year before going on again.

After its completion, the release of Faceless Lover was blocked for more than a year, because the censorship agency viewed it as an anti-war film which could discourage youths from joining the army. In 1973 screening event at the National Centre for Cinema by Minister of Open-Arms Hoàng Đức Nhã with 100% audiences as the Cabinet's members. Film director Hoàng Vĩnh Lộc and producer Kiều Chinh was also invited. After done, Mr. Nhã had got a consultation to other ministers : "What are your viewpoints ? The had better to being forever forbidden or going on release, does not it ?". One exclaimed that : "C'est une sale guerre !", so "Minister, please tell me now : What war is not a «sale guerre» ?" — said Kiều Chinh. At last, Minister Hoàng Đức Nhã suggested a vote. So the result was 19 Yes and only 1 Zero.

By star Kiều Chinh's memoir, Faceless Lover was licensed to release again from 1973. It had got an honor as the first Vietnamese film which was released at Rex Movie Theatre. Rex's peculiarity only released US blockbusters as Doctor Zhivago or Romeo and Juliet. Kiều Chinh must "insisted" Madame Ưng Thi who was a mistress of Rex Theatre. She was so shy to said : "This can not release Vietnamese ones. I am afraid of a losses and few audiences.". At last, Madame agreed a contract of a week. "If from the third day, the theatre has such still many blank seats that I will stop !" — said Madame Ưng Thi. However, in first day, director Hoàng Vĩnh Lộc only said : "Just do it, then will see !".

During the early stage, Giao Chỉ Films decided a free entrance for military men and their family. So the screening event succeed extremely with no more seats. All of crew pulled each other to Pink Night tearoom for their celebrating. Guests included of Trịnh Công Sơn, Cung Tiến, Văn Quang... then back again to Kiều Chinh's private house at Lữ Gia housing overnight. After a week of a contract, Faceless Lover was more likely to profit, so actor Minh Trường Sơn must collected money to many big bags. Madame Ưng Thi suggested immediately producer Kiều Chinh a second screening week. The film continued expanding to Đại-Nam Cinema and the system of Saigonese theatres.

By also Kiều Chinh's, Faceless Lover was the first war movie what consumed mostly paper headlines in South Vietnam. Total of its expense was 15 millions VN$ (1US$ = 277,75VN$ in 1970), but the profit was more 48 millions VN$ after a month. This account made director Hoàng Vĩnh Lộc purposed about two new films which consisted of Male and Female and In a Student's Embrace. Besides, Hoàng Vĩnh Lộc planned a post-war future for Vietnam. He wanted to realize a film project The Cartus Plant which based on the Bible. Although the event of April 30 made every things vanished into smoke. The original film tape has been lost after the National Day of Hatred, but it was still lucky to exist the copy one. Actress Kiều Chinh reissued in California from 1980s to present.

The film won the Best War Film & Best Theme (for Hoàng Vĩnh Lộc) and Best Leading Actress (for Kiều Chinh) at the Asian International Film Festival XVI in Taipei on June 6, 1971. From then until now, it was solemnly mentioned in every film curriculums of Vietnam although was still forbidden to appear on television channels.

In April 1975, while Chinh was on a film set in Singapore, she became aware that North Vietnam was about to overrun Saigon. She returned to her South Vietnam, and then to Singapore using her diplomatic passport. When the government of South Vietnam fell, she was deported from Singapore because her diplomatic passport was no longer valid. She was refused entry to France, Britain and the US. Eventually she was admitted to Canada. She was required to get a job immediately and ended up working on a chicken farm. She tried to contact previous acquaintances in the acting world including Glenn Ford and Burt Reynolds, but both were "unavailable" to help. Eventually she contacted Tippi Hedren who arranged an air ticket and a US visa for her and invited her to her home. William Holden also was supportive once he had found out about Chinh's plight. Kiều Chinh resumed her acting career in the US, her first part being in a 1977 episode of M*A*S*H "In Love and War", written by Alan Alda and loosely based on her life story.

1976 to present
Kiều Chinh lived in Canada with her children for several years. After divorcing her husband, Chinh decided going to California immigrate for her settlement. She founded Giao Chỉ Television channel to promote Vietnamese culture and arts. Kiều Chinh invited many old friends who are known authors and artists for co-operations. At the same time, she re-released two films which she still kept after April 30 sorrowful event : Faceless Lover and Love Storm.

Kiều Chinh subsequently acted in feature films as well as TV-movies including The Children of An Lac (TV), Hamburger Hill (1987), Riot (1997), Catfish in Black Bean Sauce (1999), Face (2002), Journey From The Fall (2005), 21 (2008). Beside, she became a MC of Giao Chi Television from Los Angeles.

From 1989 to 1991, she had a recurring role as Triệu Âu on the ABC Vietnam War drama series China Beach.

In her best-known role, she starred as Suyuan, one of the women in Wayne Wang’s film The Joy Luck Club in 1993. In 2005, Kiều Chinh starred in Journey from the Fall, a film tracing a Vietnamese family through the aftermath of the fall of Saigon, the re-education camps, the boat people experience, and the initial difficulties of settling in the U.S.

In 2016, she returned to Vietnam to inaugurate the 50th school which was built in Hanoi under Vietnam Children's Fund.

In 2021, she released her memoir Kieu Chinh An Artist in Exile.

Personal life
Kiều Chinh and her husband Nguyễn Năng Tế had three children. The couple divorced in 1981.

Career

Filmography

The Bells from Thienmu Temple (Hồi chuông Thiên Mụ) 1957
Forest Rain (Hồi chuông Thiên Mụ) 1962
From Saigon to Dien Bien Phu (Từ Sài Gòn đến Điện Biên Phủ) 1970
Faceless Lover (Người tình không chân dung) 1971
Love Storm (Bão tình) 1972
Roadside Shadow (Chiếc bóng bên đường) 1973
Late Summer (Hè muộn) 1973

A Yank in Viet-Nam 1964
Operation C.I.A. 1965
Switch
 "The 100,000 Ruble Rumble" 1976
Cover Girls 1977
The Hostage Heart 1977
M*A*S*H
(Season 6) Episode 130 "In Love and War" (1977)The Lucifer Complex 1978The Children of An Lac 1980Hamburger Hill 1987Gleaming the Cube 1988Vietnam-Texas 1990Welcome Home 1989The Joy Luck Club 1993Riot 1997City of Angels 1998Catfish in Black Bean Sauce 1999What's Cooking? 2000Green Dragon 2001Face 2002Journey from the Fall 2006 (this film receive 28 awards worldwide)21 (2008)21 and a Wake-Up (2009)NCIS: Los Angeles (2015)
,The Evil Within 1970Hollow (2014)Ride The Thunder (2015)

Honors
At the 2003 Vietnamese International Film Festival, Chinh received the Lifetime Achievement Award. Also in 2003, at the Women's Film Festival in Turin Kiều Chinh was awarded the Special Acting Award. In 2006, the San Diego Asian Film Festival honored Kieu Chinh with the Lifetime Achievement Award. In 2015, the San Francisco Film Fest, Festival of Globe honors Kieu Chinh with a Lifetime Achievement Award for her contributions to the film industry and more.

A documentary based on her life, Kiều Chinh: A Journey Home by Patrick Perez / KTTV, won the Emmy in 1996.

In 2009, Chinh was honored as the 2009 Woman of the Year for her work in film and community service by State Senator Lou Correa.

She was awarded a lifetime achievements award at the Asian Film Festival in Los Angeles in May 2021.

See also

Bùi Sơn Duân
Dương Hùng Cường
Đặng Trần Thức
Đoàn Châu Mậu
Hà Huyền Chi
Hoàng Anh Tuấn
Hoàng Trọng
Hoàng Vĩnh Lộc
Hùng Cường
Huy Cường
La Thoại Tân
Lê Dân
Lê Hoàng Hoa
Lê Mộng Hoàng
Lê Quỳnh
Lâm Tuyền
Lưu Trạch Hưng
Minh Đăng Khánh
Phạm Duy
Tâm Phan
Thái Thúc Nha
Thẩm Thúy Hằng
Thân Trọng Kỳ
Trần Quang

Notes and references
Notes

References

Further reading
Bibliography
Kiều Chinh, Nghệ sĩ lưu vong : Hồi ký, Văn Học Press, Irvine, California, United States, 2021.
Lê Dân, Người đẹp màn bạc Việt một thời - Kỳ 3 : Người tình không chân dung, Thanhnien Online, March 6, 2013.
Lê Quang Thanh Tâm, Điện ảnh miền Nam trôi theo dòng lịch sử, Hochiminh City Culture & Arts Publishing House, Saigon, 2015.
Phạm Công Luận, Hồi ức, sưu khảo, ghi chép về văn hóa Sài Gòn, Phuongnam Books & Thegioi Publishing House, Saigon, 2016–2022.
Lê Hồng Lâm, 101 phim Việt Nam hay nhất, Thegioi Publishing House, Saigon, 2018.
Lê Hồng Lâm, Người tình không chân dung : Khảo cứu điện ảnh miền Nam giai đoạn 1954-1975, Taodan Bookstore, Hanoi, 2020.
Max Hastings, Vietnam : An Epic Tragedy, 1945 - 1975'', Harper Perennial, New York City, October 15, 2019.
馬克斯‧黑斯廷斯（原文作者），譚天（譯者），《越南啟示錄1945-1975：美國的夢魘、亞洲的悲劇》（上、下冊不分售），八旗文化，臺北市，2022/04/08。

External links

Vietnam Children's Fund
Vietnam Cultural Profile by the British Council
 by Văn Quang

1937 births
Living people
Vietnamese emigrants to the United States
People from Hanoi
People from Saigon
People from California
American film actresses
Vietnamese film actresses
American Buddhists